The New Zealand Coaches Hall of Fame is sponsored by Athletics New Zealand and the Athletics Coaches Association of New Zealand. Founded in 2006, the purpose of the Hall of Fame is to "increase the recognition and status of coaches." It is the first coaching Hall of Fame established in Australasia.

The coaches inducted into the Hall of Fame are:
Jim Bellwood
Arthur Eustace
Arch Jelley
Arthur Lydiard

References

External links
 

Coaching awards
All-sports halls of fame
Athletics in New Zealand
Sports organisations of New Zealand
Awards established in 2006
Coaches
2006 establishments in New Zealand